Patrick Schorr (born 13 October 1994) is a German footballer who plays for Türkgücü Friedberg.

Club career
Schorr made his professional debut with 1899 Hoffenheim in the Bundesliga against 1. FC Nürnberg in a 2–1 win.

On 6 June 2019, FC Carl Zeiss Jena announced that they had signed Schorr on a two-year contract.

References

External links
 

1994 births
Living people
German footballers
Footballers from Frankfurt
TSG 1899 Hoffenheim players
TSG 1899 Hoffenheim II players
FSV Frankfurt players
1. FSV Mainz 05 II players
VfR Aalen players
FC Carl Zeiss Jena players
Association football defenders
Bundesliga players
2. Bundesliga players
3. Liga players
Germany youth international footballers